Paraburkholderia phenazinium is a Gram-negative soil bacterium.

References

phenazinium
Bacteria described in 1998